Hard Rain is the debut studio album by British melodic rock band Hard Rain. It was released in 1997 on German record label Semaphore GmbH.

Following the demise of Magnum in 1995, guitarist and songwriter Tony Clarkin and vocalist Bob Catley set off in search of a slight change in musical direction. New songs were recorded, a deal was struck and the end result was this album. Largely overlooked first time around, Sanctuary Records released a remastered and expanded edition in 2006. As most of the songs on the album were written before the split of Magnum and were actually meant for a Magnum album, Bob Catley has stated that the album was a cross between Hard Rain and Magnum.

Tony Clarkin comments: "We decided to try some things out with the backing vocals and I knew of a Midlands band called Asia Blue who'd just finished a record deal so we got Jackie and Wendy in to try some backing vocals out."

All of the drum parts on the album are drum samples or played by Tony Clarkin.

Track listing
All Tracks written by Tony Clarkin.

"Rage On" — 3:58
"Shame For The Bad Boy" — 4:52
"You'd Start A Fight" — 4:24
"Stop Me From Lovin' You" — 5:10
"Lookin' For A Way" — 5:19
"Cry Cry Cry" — 4:04
"I Must Have Been Blind" — 4:43
"Perpetual Commotion" — 4:28
"Different Kind Of Love" — 8:18
"Another Nice Mess" — 4:58

Bonus track:
<LI>"That Ain't Love" — 5:01

2006 Expanded edition included these tracks:
<LI>"Stop Me From Lovin' You" [edit] — 3:35

Singles

Stop Me From Lovin' You (1997)
"Stop Me From Lovin' You" [edit] — 3:35
"Rage On" — 3:58
"Stop Me From Lovin' You" — 5:10

Personnel
Tony Clarkin — guitar, drums
Bob Catley — vocals

Additional musicians
Sue McCloskey — vocals
Jackie Dean — vocals
Wendy Peddie — vocals

Production
Recorded at Mad Hat Studios, Wolverhampton, United Kingdom
Produced Tony Clarkin
Engineered and Mixed by Mike Cowling

References

External links
 Official Magnum site
 Hard Rain: Expanded Edition - Sanctuary Records' mini site

1997 debut albums
Albums produced by Tony Clarkin
Hard Rain (band) albums